Jeroen Geerdink (born 2 December 1978) is a Dutch darts player currently playing in British Darts Organisation events.

World Championship results

BDO

 2014: Last 40 (lost to Dave Prins 0-3)

References

External links

1978 births
Living people
Dutch darts players
British Darts Organisation players
Sportspeople from Almelo